Ekaterina Ivanova Mihaylova (born 24 October 1956) is a Bulgarian politician, who was the leader of the UDF between 2001 and 2002.

Life
Mihaylova was born in Pazardzhik, in the family of a lawyer and a physician. She graduated from Sofia University in 1978 with a degree in legal studies and started working as an attorney in 1980.

Her political career began in the 1990s when she gained prominence as a member of the UDF. Alongside Yordan Sokolov, she is considered to be among the staunchest supporters of Ivan Kostov and his policies.

In June 2001, Mihaylova succeeded Kostov as the leader of the UDF, but in March 2002 lost her position to Nadezhda Mihaylova at the 13th national conference of the party. In 2004 she became one of the founders of the DSB.

Mihaylova has been a member of five National Parliaments.

On 6 November 2007, she was honored with the academic title "honorary professor of New Bulgarian University" for her significant contributions to the development of the theoretical and practical aspects of Bulgarian parliamentarism.

References

Books
 

1956 births
Living people
People from Pazardzhik
Union of Democratic Forces (Bulgaria) politicians
20th-century Bulgarian lawyers
20th-century Bulgarian women politicians
20th-century Bulgarian politicians
Members of the National Assembly (Bulgaria)
Sofia University alumni
Bulgarian women lawyers
21st-century Bulgarian women politicians
21st-century Bulgarian politicians